Artur Gugash Magani (born 8 July 1994) is an Albanian professional footballer who plays as a forward for Egnatia.

Club career

Shkumbini Peqin
Magani was the Shkumbini top league goalscorer during the 2014–15 season with nine goals, helping the team to assure the survival.

Teuta Durrës
In June 2015, Magani left his hometown team and signed for Teuta Durrës, joining up his father, who is the coach of the team. He was given number 16 for the upcoming 2015–16 season. On 30 May 2017, following the end of 2016–17 season in which Magani was below the expectations, he decided to terminate his contract by mutual consent, becoming a free agent in the process.

Liria
On 10 July 2017, Magani completed a transfer to Football Superleague of Kosovo club Liria Prizren as a free agent.

Feronikeli
On 31 May 2018, Magani completed a transfer to Football Superleague of Kosovo club Feronikeli.

International career
Magani was part of Albania U19 squad during the qualifying stage of 2013 UEFA European Under-19 Championship, appearing in three matches in Group 7.

Personal life
He is the son of former Shkumbini Peqin, Besa Kavajë and Partizani Tirana player Gugash Magani, who has also coached Shkumbini Peqin, Besa Kavajë, Teuta Durrës and Tirana. His brother Endrien is also a footballer who plays for Lushnja.

References

External links

1994 births
Living people
People from Peqin
Association football forwards
Albanian footballers
Albania youth international footballers
KS Shkumbini Peqin players
KF Gramshi players
FC Kamza players
KF Teuta Durrës players
KF Liria players
KF Feronikeli players
KF Ballkani players
Kategoria Superiore players
Kategoria e Parë players
Football Superleague of Kosovo players
Albanian expatriate footballers
Expatriate footballers in Kosovo
Albanian expatriate sportspeople in Kosovo